Lauren Liebenberg (born 3 August 1972) is a Zimbabwe-born South African writer. Her debut novel The Voluptuous Delights of Peanut Butter and Jam was nominated for the Orange Prize for Fiction in 2008.  Her subsequent novels, The West Rand Jive Cats Boxing Club and Cry Baby, have also received international critical acclaim.

Background
Liebenberg was born and raised in Rhodesia but in her adolescence, left newly independent Zimbabwe for neighbouring South Africa, where her father worked in the gold-mining industry. She attended Brescia House, a Catholic school for girls in Johannesburg. After completing her undergraduate degree at the University of South Africa, she lived in England for some years, before returning to South Africa, where she graduated from the business school of the University of the Witwatersrand with a master's degree in business (MBA). She worked in investment banking and published in the field of financial markets, including a reference book entitled The Electronic Financial Markets of the Future, published in 2002. 

Her debut novel, The Voluptuous Delights of Peanut Butter and Jam which drew upon her experiences as a child in Rhodesia during the Rhodesian Bush War, garnered much attention from critics when it was published in 2008. The Guardian described it as "astonishingly vivid", going on to say that "Rhodesia springs to fecund, fetid life before your eyes ... like the children at its heart ... it’s immediate, rarely judgmental ... charming, upsetting and poignantly strange ... burrowing deep under your skin". The Financial Times described it as an "elegiac first novel [that] captures the insular vulnerability of this white African childhood." The Times described it as a "touching debut". The novel was also serialized by The Independent.

Apart from being longlisted for the Orange Prize for Fiction, Liebenberg was one of only three women to be shortlisted for the Orange debut prize in 2008. In 2010, the novel was longlisted for the International Dublin Literary Award.

Her follow-up novel, The West Rand Jive Cats Boxing Club, a coming-of-age story set in the gold-fields of Johannesburg, was published in 2011, and also drew warm praise from critics. The Guardian said the novel had "a true, raw feel about it" and described Liebenberg as a "terrific writer". The Times called it "moving ... [an] excellently crafted story"  and The Financial Times hailed it as "vivid ... evocative ... and compelling".  Cry Baby her third and latest novel, a satire on contemporary suburbia with a strong feminist theme, was published in February 2014. Liebenberg is married with two children and lives in Johannesburg, South Africa.

Bibliography
The Electronic Financial Markets of the Future and Survival Strategies of the Broker-Dealers by Lauren Liebenberg (Palgrave Macmillan, 2002) 
The Voluptuous Delights of Peanut Butter and Jam by Lauren Liebenberg (Virago Press, 2008) 
The West Rand Jive Cats Boxing Club by Lauren Liebenberg (Virago Press, 2010) 
Cry Baby by Lauren Liebenberg (Penguin Books, 2014)

References

Living people
1972 births
Rhodesian novelists
Zimbabwean novelists
Naturalised citizens of South Africa
Zimbabwean emigrants to South Africa
South African people of German descent
South African people of Dutch descent
South African women novelists
White South African people
White Rhodesian people
University of the Witwatersrand alumni
20th-century Zimbabwean writers
20th-century Zimbabwean women writers
21st-century Zimbabwean writers
21st-century Zimbabwean women writers